Themie Thomai Prifti (October 31, 1945 – December 19, 2020) was an Albanian politician of the Albanian Party of Labour. She served as a Minister of Agriculture from 1986 to 1987.

Career 
Themie Thomai initially worked as an agricultural worker  and then completed a degree in Agricultural Sciences at the Agricultural University Tirana. After graduating, she worked as an agricultural economist before becoming chairman of an agricultural cooperative with over 4,000 members in 1972. On October 28, 1974, Themie Thomai became for the Party of Labor of Albania PPSh (Partia e Punës e Shqipërisë) for the first time a member of the People's Assembly (Kuvendi Popullor) chosen who she from the eighth to the end of the twelfth Legislative period on February 4, 1992.

As the successor to Pirro Dodbiba she became Minister of Agriculture on (Ministre e Bujqësisë) April 29, 1976 into the sixth government of Prime Minister Mehmet Shehu called. The reason for Dodbiba's dismissal as minister in April 1976 was “professional failure” in the implementation of the party's production goals in agriculture. In 1983 it published a seven-point program for the intensification of agriculture with the subtitle "The constant main path to the development of agricultural production". She held the ministerial office until she was replaced Pali Miska on February 2, 1989.  After her dismissal as minister, she became first secretary of the PPSh party committee in February 1989 Lushnja district. At the same time she was vice-chairman of the Democratic Front from 1979 to 1984 (Fronti Democracy), a mass organization to draw up the lists of candidates for the elections to the People's Assembly

Later life and death 
Themie Thomai died from COVID-19 in Tirana, Albania, on December 19, 2020, at age 75. She is survived by her daughter, son, and grandchildren.

References 

1945 births
2020 deaths
People from Lushnjë
20th-century Albanian women politicians
Labour Party of Albania politicians
Government ministers of Albania
Women government ministers of Albania
Agriculture ministers of Albania
People from Tirana
Deaths from the COVID-19 pandemic in Albania